Danaus ismare, the ismare tiger, is a butterfly found in tropical Indonesia. It belongs to the brush-footed butterflies family.

Subspecies
D. i. ismare (Moluccas)
D. i. fulvus Ribbe, 1890 (south-eastern Sulawesi, Bangka, Bangai group, Talaud, Sangir)
D. i. felicia Fruhstorfer, 1907 (Buru, Obi)
D. i. ismareola Butler, 1866 (Halmahera, Ternate, Bachan)
D. i. goramica Fruhstorfer, 1907 (Goram)
D. i. alba Morishita, 1981 (northern Sulawesi, Sangihe, Talaus)

See also
Danainae
Nymphalidae

References

External links
Nymphalidae

Danaus (butterfly)
Butterflies of Asia
Butterflies of Indonesia
Butterflies described in 1780